Chris Philo FAcSS (born 1960) is Professor of Geography at the Department of Geographical and Earth Sciences, the University of Glasgow.

Philo graduated from the Sidney Sussex College of Cambridge University and became a Research Fellow there. In 1989 he joined the Department of Geography at the University of Wales, Lampeter, holding that post for six years, until 1995.  He then joined the University of Glasgow as a Professor, becoming head of the department in 2002. In 2006 Chris was replaced as Head of Department by Professor Trevor Hoey and was enlisted on the Geography and Environmental Studies RAE Sub-Panel.

His interests have been in the historical geographies of 'madness' and mental health and mental health care provision.  Later, he has contributed to the emerging, and increasingly significant, sub-discipline of animal geographies, with eclectic writing on other topics.   A devotee of the work of Michel Foucault, his research extended and localised Foucault's history of madness to England and Wales. Over a decade in the writing, his major work, based on an extensive PhD thesis, was published by a minor press in Wales as A Geographical History of Institutional Provision for the Insane from Medieval Times to the 1860s in England and Wales: The Space Reserved for Insanity. Always a generous collaborator, he has co-edited numerous general anthologies of human geography.

Partial bibliography 
 Lee, R., Castree, N., Kitchin, R., Lawson, V., Paasi, A., Philo, C., Radcliffe, S., Roberts, S. M. and Withers, C. (Eds.) 2014. The SAGE Handbook of Human Geography. Sage.  
 Philo, C. 2008. Theory and Methods: Critical Essays in Human Geography. Ashgate. 
 Philo, C. 2004. A Geographical History of Institutional Provision for the Insane from Medieval Times to the 1860s in England and Wales: The Space Reserved for Insanity. Edwin Mellen Press, Lewiston and Queenston, USA, and Lampeter, Wales, UK.
 Cloke, P., Cook, I., Crang, P., Goodwin, M., Painter, J., Philo, C. 2004. Practising Human Geography. Sage, London.
 Philo, C. & Wilbert, C. 2000. Animal Spaces, Beastly Places, New Geographies of Human-Animal Relations, Routledge, London

See also
Human geography
Lampeter Geography School

References 
 "Animal Spaces, Beastly Places: New Geographies of Human-Animal Relations" Lisa Uddin, review in Invisible Culture, University of Rochester.
 "Professor Chris Philo is elected a Fellow of the Royal Society of Edinburgh", Latest News, Department of Geographical and Earth Sciences, University of Glasgow
 "Professor Chris Philo FRSE", biography at University of Glasgow

1960 births
Academics of the University of Glasgow
British geographers
Alumni of Sidney Sussex College, Cambridge
Living people
Fellows of the Academy of Social Sciences
Fellows of the Royal Society of Edinburgh
Fellows of Sidney Sussex College, Cambridge
Academics of the University of Wales, Lampeter